The 2017–18 Boston College Eagles men's basketball team represented Boston College during the 2017–18 NCAA Division I men's basketball season. The Eagles, led by fourth-year head coach Jim Christian, played their home games at the Conte Forum as members of the Atlantic Coast Conference. They finished the season 19–16, 7–11 in ACC play to finish in 12th place. In the ACC tournament, they defeated Georgia Tech and NC State before losing in the quarterfinals to Clemson. They received an invitation to the National Invitation Tournament where they lost in the first round to Western Kentucky.

Previous season
The Eagles finished the 2016–17 season 9–23, 2–16 in ACC play to finish in last place. As the No. 15 seed in the ACC tournament, they lost in the first round to Wake Forest.

Offseason

Departures

Incoming transfers

Recruiting class of 2017

Recruiting class of 2018

Roster

Schedule and results

|-
!colspan=9 style=|Regular season

|-
!colspan=9 style=|ACC tournament

|-
!colspan=9 style=|NIT

Source.

See also
 2017–18 Boston College Eagles women's basketball team

References

Boston College Eagles men's basketball seasons
Boston College
Boston College Eagles men's basketball
Boston College Eagles men's basketball
Boston College
Boston College Eagles men's basketball
Boston College Eagles men's basketball